Trần Thị Cẩm Ly (born 30 March 1970) better known as Cẩm Ly, is a Vietnamese pop singer, who is also known for Southern Vietnam folk songs.

She came to national attention in 1993. Her sisters are Minh Tuyết and Hà Phương.

Background
Her real name is Trần Thị Cẩm Ly and was born on 30 March 1970, in Saigon. Her hometown is in Qui Nhơn, Bình Định. She is the third child (her fan named her as Chi Tu according to Southern order in the family) of family with six siblings, her father is composer Tran Quan Hien, her two younger sisters are Hà Phương and Minh Tuyết who are also singers (apparently they're locating oversea). In 2004, she married composer Minh Vy (whose real name is Doan Huu Minh). Apparently, she has two daughters, one is Cam Uyen (born in 2008, nickname as Thỏ (Bunny) and Cam Anh (born in 2007, nickname as La).

Music career
She exposed her singing talent when she was little. In 1993, she and Minh Tuyết performed a song for which the same year they won duo first prize from Hoa Binh Theater. After this event, she began singing professionally and signed a contract with Kim Loi Studio – which was the most famous studio at that time.

In 1997, Minh Tuyết moved to the US and she had to temporarily stop performing due to health issue. One year later, she came back and released two albums featuring singer Canh Han, in 1999, she and singer Dan Truong released the album Neu Phoi Pha Ngay Mai. In 2000, she marked her solo career by releasing the first album Mai Khong Phai.

In next years, she often performed songs from composer Nguyen Nhat Huy such as: Nguoi Ve Cuoi Pho, Bo Ben La, Thuong Nho Nguoi Dung, May Chieu, Tinh Khong Doi Thay. The first ever folk album titled Em Gai Que which was released by Kim Loi Studio consisted of 11 songs under influence of folk song: Quen Cay Cau Dua, Noi Buon Chim Sao, Phuong Buon, Chanh Long, Nho Me Ly Mo Coi, Mua Chieu Mien Trung.

In July 2001, she was the first Vietnamese singer to have DVD show and it was the period of time where she confirmed her stable style and completely separated with Dan Truong. She was one of the most successful exclusive singer of Kim Loi Studio.

She was also the first singer to hold a free concert for students which was titled as Vong Quanh Ky Tuc Xa in 2003 and 2004.

In 2008, she held another liveshow at Lan Anh Stage as a 15th anniversary and to mark her first role ever for a cai luong play. The same year, she appeared in Thúy Nga's Paris by Night 92 show.

In 2009, she held the liveshow Tu Tinh Que Huong which was the second liveshow of her career as well as releasing two albums Em Khong The Quen – Tinh Khuc Minh Vy and ballad folk album Bien Tinh.

In 2011, she held the third liveshow titled Tu Tinh Que Huong 2 with four different genres: ballad, folk, pop and ancient cai luong.

In 2012, she held the liveshow Tu Tinh Que Huong 3.

In 2013, she and Minh Tuyết held the liveshow Tu Tinh Que Huong 4 as 20th anniversary of both sisters. The live show was held for two nights at Hoa Binh Theater, Ho Chi Minh City with large audiences.

In 2014, she was the coach of The Voice Kid Vietnam and made Thien Nhan a winner of second season. At the same time, she and Minh Vy were the duo coach of the show Vo Chong Minh Hat and also the winner.

In 2015, she continued with Tu Tinh Que Huong, bringing its fifth installment at Hoa Binh Theater, Ho Chi Minh City.

Reception
From 2001 to 2006, she was always voted to be one of the top 10 favorite singer of Green Wave Awards.

She was one of the pioneers for giving free concert for students as she had a liveshows at 5 different dormitories in Ho Chi Minh City.

In June 2015, YouTube introduced Music Insight and she was the only Vietnamese singer to have the highest views on YouTube. The static was rated from September 2014 to June 2015 based on Content ID, she had totally 757 million of views, the second was Dam Vinh Hung (450 million views).

Solo albums

Tình cuối mùa đông (the best of Cẩm Ly), 2000
vol 1. Mãi không phai, 2000
vol 2. Phố hoa Cơn mơ hoang đường, 2001
vol 3. Bến vắng Biết yêu khi nào, 2002
Cánh chim lạc loài, single, 2002
vol 4. Tuổi mộng xứ đông 12 bến nước, 2002
Sáo sang sông Mùa đông xứ lạ, 2003
Tình Khúc Nguyễn Nhất Huy, 2003
vol 5. Có những chiều em đến Hoài công, 2003
vol 6. Người nhớ không người Em sẽ là người ra đi, 2004
vol 7. Người ơi hãy chia tay, 2005
Em gái quê, 2005
Mùa mưa đi qua Em về kẻo trời mưa, 2005
vol 8. Kẻ đứng sau tình yêu, 2005
Người đến sau Sao anh ra đi, 2005
Buồn con sáo sậu, 2006
vol 9. Áng mây buồn, 2006
Tiếng thạch sùng, 2007
vol 10. Em sẽ quên Đêm có mưa rơi, 2007
Khi đã yêu, 2007
Chuyện chúng mình, 2008
vol 11. Đợi chờ những mùa đông, 2008
Em không thể quên, 2009
Biển tình, 2009
vol 12. Biển trắng pha lê, 2010
Gió lên, 2010
Chuyện tình hoa bướm, 2010
Nửa trái tim, 2011
Tôi mơ Cô Tư bến phà, 2011
Thiên đàng ái ân Chiều cuối tuần, 2011
Về bên em, 2012
Sầu đâu quê ngoại, 2012
Hát cho người tình nhớ, 2014
Hai lối mộng, 2015

Awards

Top Ten The Best Singer Green Wave, 2001-2002
Favorite singer of Purple Ink newspaper, 2001-2002
Favorite singer Thursday Afternoon Club, 2001-2002
Mai Vang Award by the newspaper Workers organize 2002
Top ten most favorite singer Green Wave, 2002-2003
Top ten most favorite singer Green Wave, 2003-2004
League VTV – Songs I Love – "You Never Know Love", 2003-2004
Top ten most favorite singer Green Wave, 2004-2005
League VTV – Songs I Love – "The Corn is Mo" – 2005
Mai Vang Award by the Newspaper Workers Organisation 2005
Top ten most favorite singer Green Wave, 2005-2006
Top ten most favorite singer Green Wave, 2006-2007
Top 10 Green Wave achievements 10 years from 1997 to 2007
Top ten most favorite singer Green Wave, 2007-2008
Video Music Excellence Award Mai Vang 08 – Mai Vang 09
Women folk singer favorite at Mai Vang Award 2007
Women folk singer favorite at Mai Vang Award 2008
2008: received the Guinness Vietnam with notebooks reformist "Lan and Diep"
Women folk singer favorite at Mai Vang Award 2009
Award singer represents the most successful straight gold album 12-2009
Female artists represent the most successful 2009 "Album Gio Len"
Female singers are the most popular 2009 "Album Em khong the quen"
Singer of the Year "Dedication Music Awards 2009"
League Most Outstanding Female Artist – Mark Indian Mai Vang 15 years – 2009
Women folk singer favorite at Mai Vang Award 2010
Top ten most favorite singer Green Wave, 2010-2011
Female Singer Award favorite HTV Awards 2011
Top 5 best singer – Table GOLD Green Wave, 2014
Singing songs for the music copyright collecting remember most from Nhaccuatui.com votes – 2014
Month 6/2015: BBC, YouTube announced new analytics tools Music Insight has confirmed singer Cam Ly of Vietnam as singer with the most views 860 in Vietnam with more than a million views on YouTube (data access Monthly 7/2015). Music Insight are information of more than 10,000 most popular artists on YouTube and Google two vehicles, including Vietnam artists. [2]
Republic of socialist Vietnam awarded certificates of merit many times.

References

External links

1970 births
Living people
People from Bình Định province
People from Ho Chi Minh City
Vietnamese women singers
Vietnamese pop singers
Folk-pop singers